The 1870 Melbourne Cup was a two-mile handicap horse race which took place on Thursday, 10 November 1870.

This year was the tenth running of the Melbourne Cup. The entire carnival was pushed back to a week due to a waterlogged track. This race has become a big part of Melbourne Cup folklore. Ballarat publican Walter Craig bought Nimblefoot from Melbourne bookmaker Joe Thompson. Serval months before the 1870 race Craig dreams of a horse in his colours winning the race but with its jockey wearing a black arm band. Craig told friends about this and was sure that Nimblefoot would win, but he would not live to see the 12/1 shot's tense battle with Lapdog. Craig died on the morning of 17 August from gout and pneumonia. Craig's dream was recounted in The Age newspaper the day before the cup. At about 4 O'clock Ms. Craig with tears in her eyes reveals to Ballarat that Nimblefoot had won with its jockey wearing a black arm band. The winning time of 3:37.0 was at the time the fastest winning time in the race's history.

This is the list of placegetters for the 1870 Melbourne Cup.

See also

 Melbourne Cup
 List of Melbourne Cup winners
 Victoria Racing Club

References

External links
1870 Melbourne Cup footyjumpers.com

1870
Melbourne Cup
Melbourne Cup
19th century in Melbourne
1870s in Melbourne